Andy Holt is a British businessman and the current owner of Accrington Stanley FC. He made a fortune in plastics, and joined the club's board in 2015. He assumed control of the club in October 2015, when it was on the verge of folding due to debt. He gained some renown for his Twitter activity responding to club supporters, and rows with the EFL, rival owners, Blackburn Rovers supporters (for insulting Jack Walker) and even Boris Johnson (for his COVID-19 response).

References

British football chairmen and investors
Year of birth missing (living people)
Living people
Accrington Stanley F.C.